Micronesian describes something of, from, or related to Micronesia, a subregion of Oceania composed of hundreds of small islands in the Pacific Ocean.

Micronesian may refer to:

People and society
 Micronesian people, people from the general region of Micronesia
 Micronesian citizen, a citizen of the Federated States of Micronesia, an independent sovereign island nation 
 Micronesian passport, issued by the Federated States of Micronesia
 Micronesian Americans, Americans descended from people of the Federated States of Micronesia
 Micronesian Japanese, people from Japan who settled in Micronesia in the first half of the 20th century
 Micronesian mythology, the traditional belief systems of the people of Micronesia
 Micronesian languages, twenty languages forming a family of Oceanic languages
 Micronesian Pidgin English, an English-based pidgin language spoken in nineteenth-century Micronesia

Biology 
 Micronesian imperial pigeon, a species of bird in the family Columbidae
 Micronesian kingfisher, a group of kingfishers from the Pacific Islands of Guam, Pohnpei and Palau
 Micronesian megapode, an endangered megapode which inhabits islands of the Western Pacific Ocean
 Micronesian myzomela, a species of bird in the honeyeater family, Meliphagidaeyes
 Micronesian starling, a species of starling in the family Sturnidae
 Micronesian swiftlet, a species of swift in the family Apodidae

Other 
 Micronesian Games, a quadrennial international multi-sport event within the Micronesian region

See also 
 Pacific Islander
 

Language and nationality disambiguation pages